Raival is a commune in the Meuse department in Grand Est in north-eastern France. The former communes of Rosnes and Érize-la-Grande are within the limits of the town. Vignotte, a mild creamy cheese obtainable in the UK, is produced there.

See also
Communes of the Meuse department

References

Communes of Meuse (department)